People Like Us is a British reality documentary series broadcast on BBC Three. The programme tries to reflect the true lives of some of the residents of council estates in England, which according to the programme have continually ranked as the most deprived in the UK. The show has been criticised by Manchester residents, as well as the wider UK for showing a very stereotypical view of council estate residents.

The series mainly featured the areas of Harpurhey, Moston and Collyhurst. As a result of how the series depicted the areas,  'I love Harpurhey' banners were displayed by local residents to try and dispel the blanket mistruths of the broadcasters. Each episode lasts 60 minutes. The narrator of the programme is Natalie Casey.

References

External links 
 

2013 British television series debuts
2010s British reality television series
2014 British television series debuts
BBC television documentaries